Three Friends and an Invention is a 1927 Soviet film directed by Aleksei Popov.

Plot 

The film is a light-hearted satire about the misadventures of two friends who are young workers at a soap-making factory. They invent a packaging machine and face many hardships with nepmen and bureaucrats until their machine is recognized. Finally, thanks to their alliance with the Komsomol the friends achieve reasonable results in their inventive labor and pursuits. They are joined in their adventures by Dasha, another worker at the soap factory, whom they frequently flirt with.

From the book Memories and Reflections on Theater written by the film's director, Aleksei Popov:

A. D. Popov said that the idea was born in him, as a response to the comedy Ole & Axel, which was running successfully on Soviet screens. And really, it was easy to notice in the main role of the film- small, nimble Akhov and tall, ungainly Makhov- the features of their cinematic inspirations, Ole & Axel. Nevertheless, Popov's comedy was both very modern and genuinely accessible. It scathingly ridiculed bureaucracy, was full of cheerful humor in its portrayal of a far province, a quiet backwater corner, where one can begin a new life. Popov lovingly resurrected onscreen these quiet, lost places, fields of rye, flowing spring waters, and his scenic sketches of everyday episodes that were full of their own sharp and precise observations.

By some measure, this film could be considered the first Soviet road movie. The heroes make their way to the district center on a steam boat, then move onto a makeshift float, encountering the same bureaucratic obstacles everywhere.

Starring 
 Sergei Lavrentyev as Akhov
 Aleksei Popov
 Olga Tretyakova as Dasha
 Sergei Yablokov as Makhov

References

External links 
 

1927 films
1920s Russian-language films
Soviet silent feature films
Soviet black-and-white films